Marion Huber von Appen (born 26 September 1930) was a Chilean hurdler. She competed in the women's 80 metres hurdles and 4 × 100 metres relay at the 1948 Summer Olympics.

References

External links
 

1930 births
Living people
Athletes (track and field) at the 1948 Summer Olympics
Athletes (track and field) at the 1952 Summer Olympics
Chilean female sprinters
Chilean female hurdlers
Olympic athletes of Chile
Place of birth missing (living people)
Pan American Games medalists in athletics (track and field)
Pan American Games silver medalists for Chile
Athletes (track and field) at the 1951 Pan American Games
Medalists at the 1951 Pan American Games
20th-century Chilean women